Aristazabal Island is an island situated south west of Princess Royal Island in British Columbia, Canada. The island was named on August 30, 1792, by Lieutenant Commander Jacinto Caamaño of the Spanish corvette Aranzazu for the Spanish captain Gabriel de Aristazábal, one of the most noted Spanish commanders of the time. Incidentally, the misspelling "Aristizable" appears on a chart owned by the English explorer, George Vancouver.

Surrounding islands
Thomson Island is situated west of Aristazabal Island in Borrowman Bay.

References

Islands of British Columbia
North Coast of British Columbia
Spanish history in the Pacific Northwest
Tsimshian